(born 28 March 1964, Kanazawa, Ishikawa) is a Japanese horse trainer.
He trained the first and second placing horses in the 2006 Melbourne Cup, Delta Blues and Pop Rock. Other notable horses Sumii has trained include Kane Hekili, Vodka, Victoire Pisa, and Epiphaneia.

Sumii retired in February 2021 to succeed his mother's work as an active member of the Tenrikyo.

Major Wins
Japan

 Kikuka Sho (Japanese St. Legers) - (3) - Delta Blues (2004), Epiphaneia (2013), Kiseki (2017)
 Yushun Himba - (2) - Cesario (2005), Tall Poppy (2008)
 Japan Dirt Derby - (2) - Kane Hekili (2005), Friendship (2006)
 Derby Grand Prix - (1) - Kane Hekili (2005)
 Mile Championship - (1) - Hat Trick (2005)
 Japan Cup Dirt - (2) - Kane Hekili (2005, 2008)
 February Stakes - (1) - Kane Hekili (2006)
 Teio Sho - (1) - Kane Hekili (2006)
 Hanshin Juvenile Fillies - (2) - Vodka (2006), Tall Poppy (2007)
 Tokyo Yushun (Japanese Derby) - (2) - Vodka (2007), Roger Barows (2019)
 Yasuda Kinen - (2) - Vodka (2008, 2009)
 Tenno Sho (Autumn) - (1) - Vodka (2008)
 Tokyo Daishōten - (1) - Kane Hekili (2008)
 Kawasaki Kinen - (1) - Kane Hekili (2009)
 Victoria Mile - (1) - Vodka (2009)
 Japan Cup - (2) - Vodka (2009), Epiphaneia (2014)
 Satsuki Sho - (2) - Victoire Pisa (2010), Saturnalia (2019)
 Arima Kinen - (1) - Victoire Pisa (2010)
 Shuka Sho - (1) - Aventura (2011)
 Japan Breeding farm's Cup Ladies' Classic - (1) - Sambista (2014)
 Queen Elizabeth II Cup - Lachesis (2014)
 Champion's Cup - (1) - Sambista (2014)
 Asahi Hai Futurity Stakes - Leontes (2015)
 Kashiwa Kinen (1) - Wide Pharaoh (2020)

 United States of America

 American Oaks - (1) - Cesario (2005)

 Hong Kong

 Hong Kong Mile - (1) - Hat Trick (2005)
 Queen Elizabeth II Cup - (1) - Rulership (2012)

 United Arab Emirates

 Dubai World Cup - (2) - Kane Hekili (2006), Victoire Pisa (2011)

 Australia

 Melbourne Cup - (1) - Delta Blues (2006)

References

Japanese horse trainers
1964 births
People from Kanazawa, Ishikawa
Living people
Tenrikyo